Xieng Khouang Airport is an airport in Phonsavan, Laos .

Its name is derived from the Xiangkhoang Plateau, which gives name to the Xiangkhouang Province on which it is located. It is the main access gateway for tourists visiting the nearby Plain of Jars.

Airlines and destinations

References

Airports in Laos
Buildings and structures in Xiangkhouang province